Petcube is a technology company that designs and develops smart devices for pets which combine cameras with treat dispensers and laser pointer toys.

History 

The company was founded in 2012 in Kyiv, Ukraine by Alex Neskin, Yaroslav Azhnyuk, and Andrey Klen. Typically for a startup, Petcube aimed to solve the problem the founders faced on their own: Neskin's dog Rocky suffered and misbehaved due to separation anxiety.

Within two Kickstarter campaigns the project raised $250,000 in 2013 (becoming the best funded pet product by that time) and $315,000 in 2016. In 2017, Petcube announced a treat partnership with Wellness and acquised a Canadian pet-focused startup Petbot. In the following years, Petcube raised over $14 million in seed money and Series A financing from Y Combinator, Almaz Capital, Aventures, and other investors.

Products 

Petcube offers three devices: Petcube Camera, Petcube Bites with camera and a treat dispenser, and Petcube Play which features a laser pointer to keep the pet entertained (distracted) while the owner is away.

The devices can stream and record video, toss treats, allow users to communicate with a pet two-way, and connect to Amazon Alexa. Paid subscription enables cloud video storage, automated recording triggered by sound or motion, smart alerts (bark, meow, pet, and human notifications), and adds a web interface.

Charity 

Petcube cooperates with shelters and helps to save pets and find them new homws. The company donates its products and organize events for pet activists. As a Ukrainian brand, Petcube joined United24 charity project and donates proceeds from its pet cameras to the future rebuilding of Ukraine.

References 

Manufacturing companies established in 2013
Companies based in San Francisco
Technology companies established in 2013
Cameras
Kickstarter-funded products